The 2017 season was the 67th season of competitive association football in China.

Promotion and relegation

National teams

China national football team

FIFA ranking

Results and fixtures

China women's national football team

FIFA ranking

Results and fixtures

China national under-23 football team

U-23 national team

U-21 selection team

China national under-20 football team

China women's national under-20 football team

China national under-17 football team

U-15

U-16

China women's national under-17 football team

AFC competitions

2017 AFC Champions League

Qualifying play-off

Play-off round

|-

|}

Group stage

Group F

Group G

Group H

Knockout stage

Round of 16

|-

|}

Quarter-finals

|-

|}

Semi-finals

|-

|}

Men's football

League season

Chinese Super League

China League One

China League Two

North Group

South Group

Cup competitions

Chinese FA Cup

Chinese FA Super Cup

Women's Football

League season

Chinese Women's Super League

League table

China Women's League One
League table

Chinese Women's Super League Relegation Playoff

Cup competitions

Chinese Women's Football Championship

Final

Chinese FA Women's Cup

Final

Chinese FA Women's Super Cup

Notes

References

 
Seasons in Chinese football